The men's team small-bore rifle was one of 15 events on the Shooting at the 1908 Summer Olympics programme.  Teams consisted of four shooters.  Regulation of the equipment used in the event was done through proscribing ammunition weighing more than 140 grains, with a velocity of more than 1,450 feet per second, or having a hard metal base. Magnifying and telescopic sights were prohibited. Each shooter fired 40 shots, half at 50 yards and half at 100 yards.  Maximum score for a shot was 5 points, giving a maximum total possible of 200 points per shooter or 800 per team.

The event would be held again in 1912, though only at 50 metres. A similar team event, standing at 50 metres, would be held in 1920.

Results

References

Sources
 
 

Men's rifle small-bore team